Womalilla is a rural town and locality in the Maranoa Region, Queensland, Australia.

Geography 
Womalilla Creek rise through the locality in the north-west and flows south-east to become a tributary of the Maranoa River.

The Warrego Highway runs through from east to west. 

The Western railway line runs from east to west, south of the highway. 

Ooline railway station was in the north-west north of the locality and is the highest point on the Western Railway Line west of Kingsthorpe. 

It was named by the Queensland Railways Department on 11 May 1916 and is an Aboriginal word describing a particular species of tree.

History 
The town's name is derived from a pastoral run name used from 1862, reportedly an Aboriginal word group for trees by a creek (from womal meaning tree/timber and illa meaning creek).

Womalilla Creek No 1 Provisional School and Womalilla Creek No 2 Provisional School were to be opened together in 1913 to operate as a pair of part-time schools (meaning they would share one teacher between the two schools. However, the No 2 school opened on 24 August 1913 but it was not until 3 July 1914 that the No 1 school opened. Both schools closed in 1929 due to low student numbers.

On 17 April 1935, the new Womalilla Provisional School opened and operated on a full-time basis. In 1937, it became Womalilla State School. The school closed in 1954.

References

External links 

 

Towns in Queensland
Maranoa Region
Localities in Queensland